WQLS (90.5 FM) was an American non-commercial educational radio station licensed to serve the community of Camden, Alabama. The station's broadcast license is held by Wilcox Broadcast Communications, LLC.

Programming
WQLS broadcast an Urban Contemporary, Blues, Soul, Gospel and Talk format to the greater Wilcox County, Alabama, area.

History
In October 2007, Ken Layton's TBTA Ministries applied to the Federal Communications Commission (FCC) for a construction permit for a new broadcast radio station. The FCC granted this permit on December 17, 2008, with a scheduled expiration date of December 17, 2011. The new station was assigned call sign "WQLS" on August 25, 2010.

With station construction yet to begin in May 2009, TBTA Ministries contracted to sell the permit for this station to Jimmy Jarrell's Alabama Christian Radio, Inc. The deal also included the permit for WXIV in Lumpkin, Georgia, plus the permits to build three other radio stations in Georgia and Alabama for a total purchase price of $1. The FCC approved the deal on July 16, 2009, and the transaction was formally consummated on September 1, 2009.

After construction and testing were completed in December 2011, the station was granted its broadcast license on January 6, 2012.

On January 20, 2012, Alabama Christian Radio, Inc., contracted to sell WQLS and sister station WTBT (later WVPL, 90.5 FM, Dozier, Alabama) to Timothy Townsend's Townsend Broadcasting Enterprise for a combined sale price of $3,000. The FCC accepted the application for assignment of these permits on February 14, 2012, and granted the assignment on April 16, 2012.

Effective July 6, 2016, Townsend Broadcasting sold WQLS to Wilcox Broadcast Communications, LLC for $2,800.

WQLS's license was cancelled by the FCC on April 2, 2020, due to the station failing to file an application for license renewal by April 1.

References

External links

QLS
Radio stations established in 2012
Wilcox County, Alabama
2012 establishments in Alabama
Radio stations disestablished in 2020
Defunct radio stations in the United States
Defunct religious radio stations in the United States
2020 disestablishments in Alabama
QLS